Tumamoca macdougalii Rose is a member of the Cucurbitaceae or gourd family.  Also called the Tumamoc globeberry, it is native to a very narrow area of the Sonoran Desert, and is found in both Sonora and Arizona. It is one of two species in genus Tumamoca.

Tumamoca macdougalii is a monoecious vine climbing over various shrubs. Stems die in the fall, but tuberous roots generally persist through the winter. Leaves are deeply 3-lobed, nearly cleft, each lobe similarly divided into several sections. Flowers are pale yellow with narrow corolla lobes. Pistillate (female) flowers are solitary in the leaf axils; staminate (male) flowers in racemes of 2-6 flowers. Fruits are spherical, red, rarely yellow, about 10 mm (0.4 inches) in diameter.

Uses
The Seri and Tohono O'odham eat the fruits of T. macdougalii.

References

Cucurbitoideae
Flora of the Sonoran Deserts
Flora of Arizona
Flora of Sonora